Alex Mathew, popularly known as Maya the Drag Queen or Mayamma is a drag queen from India.

Biography
Mathew acknowledged he was gay in September 2014, and credits his mother for the courage to do so.  He was inspired by RuPaul and Bianca Del Rio.  He has promoted local cultural identity in the drag art form, performed in many places in India, given multiple TEDx talks, and conducting workshops.  Prasad Bidapa did a photo shoot with him in 2017.  As an activist, Mathew engages in the issues of gender and feminism.  He has performed at live events, and hosted the talk show Chaaya with Maya, crediting Keshav Suri for the support to be Maya.

References

External links
 An unapologetic drag queen of India | Alex Mathew | TEDxSGGSCC
 We are Queer & We are Here | Maya the Drag Queen | Alex Mathew | TEDxIITRoorkee
 Your identity is upon you to define | Alex Mathew | TEDxMICA

Living people
1988 births
Indian drag queens
Indian gay men